Suzanne S. Rancourt (born 1959) is a poet and veteran of both the United States Marine Corps and the United States Army as well being an Abenaki and Huron descendant. She was born and raised in west central Maine. She has written a collection of poetry called Billboard in the Clouds, which won the Native Writers' Circle of the Americas First Book Award in 2001, and some of her other work also appears in The Journal of Military Experience, Volume II. Her work has also been published in the literary journals Callaloo and The Cimarron Review, as well as many other anthologies.

Rancourt has a Masters of Fine Arts in Poetry from Vermont College and a Master of Science in Educational Psychology from University at Albany, SUNY. She is currently living in Hadley, New York. Rancourt has coordinated powwows. She has worked as a counselor for Traumatic Brain Injury (TBI) in New York and has also worked as a parent education specialist for a Head Start program in the northern part of the state. Among other things, Rancourt is also a singer/songwriter, a personal fitness trainer, a percussionist, an herbal educator, and a dance instructor.

Work
Rancourt's poems have been praised for their vivid imagery and simple, elegant style. Her fiction and poetry have appeared in many journals, including Peauxdunque Review, MacQueen's Quinterly, The Massachusetts Review, Turtle Island Quarterly, New Feathers Anthology, Eastern Iowa Review, The Brooklyn Review, Aji Magazine, Nine Muses Poetry, the Journal of Military Experience, Cimarron Review, Callaloo, and others.

Her first published collection of poetry was titled Billboard in the Clouds published by Curbstone Press. It addresses at least three themes: poems about childhood include descriptions of nature, her parents, and grandparents; ancestral poems cover stories Rancourt has heard conveying deep connections between her people and their land; and poems about contemporary life cover such topics as Rancourt's life with her son, her current home, and her military experience.

Her second poetry collection was the 2017 publication murmurs at the gate, in which she explored, using fictional events and others from her own life, the lives and experiences of people who survived different forms of hardship.

Awards
 2001, Native Writers' Circle of the Americas First Book Award

Publications

References

Further reading

Reviews

External links

1959 births
Living people
American women poets
Native American poets
University at Albany, SUNY alumni
Vermont College of Fine Arts alumni
Native American women writers
21st-century American women